Jordi Vidal Martín Rojas (born 7 February 1991) is a Spanish professional footballer who plays for Ungmennafélagið Víkingur as a midfielder.

Club career
Born in Arrecife, Province of Las Palmas, Vidal joined Real Madrid's youth system in 2004, at the age of 13. He made his debut as a senior with the third team, for which he appeared in two full Tercera División seasons.

In the 2013 summer, after an unsuccessful trial for AEL Limassol from the Cypriot First Division, Martín returned to his native Canary Islands and signed for UD Las Palmas Atlético. From January 2014 to June 2015 he competed in Greece, with Kallithea F.C. and AEL Kalloni FC; his debut in top flight football arrived whilst at the service of the latter club, as he started and played 74 minutes in a 1–0 home win against PAS Giannina F.C. for the Superleague.

On 6 August 2015, Martín returned to Spain and its Segunda División B and joined SD Leioa.

Vidal joined CD Manchego Ciudad Real on 1 February 2019.

References

External links

Lapreferente profile 

1991 births
Living people
People from Lanzarote
Sportspeople from the Province of Las Palmas
Spanish footballers
Footballers from the Canary Islands
Association football midfielders
Segunda División B players
Tercera División players
Real Madrid C footballers
UD Las Palmas Atlético players
SD Leioa players
Gimnástica de Torrelavega footballers
Super League Greece players
Football League (Greece) players
Kallithea F.C. players
AEL Kalloni F.C. players
FC Oberlausitz Neugersdorf players
UD Lanzarote players
Ungmennafélagið Víkingur players
Spanish expatriate footballers
Expatriate footballers in Greece
Spanish expatriate sportspeople in Greece
Expatriate footballers in Germany
Spanish expatriate sportspeople in Germany
Expatriate footballers in Iceland
Spanish expatriate sportspeople in Iceland